Confederación Obrera Ibero Americana was a short-lived Ibero-American trade union confederation, formed by the International Federation of Trade Unions at a meeting in Buenos Aires, Argentina, in 1928. Participants at the founding conference were the Confederación Obrera Argentina and pro-government trade unionists from Venezuela, Uruguay, Cuba and Spain.

References

Inter-American trade union federations
International Federation of Trade Unions
Trade unions established in 1928